Waldsea Lake is a lake in central Saskatchewan, Canada 100 km east of Saskatoon near Carmel, Saskatchewan. The lake is partially saline with strong concentrations of sodium,  sulfate, magnesium and chloride ions.  It is part of the Lenore Lake Basin, which includes several saline lakes (Lenore, Basin, Middle, Frog, Ranch, Murphy, Flat, Mantrap, Houghton, Deadmoose and Waldsea) as well as the freshwater St. Brieux Lake and Burton Lake.  The basin has no natural outlet.

See also
List of lakes of Saskatchewan

References

Lakes of Saskatchewan
Saline lakes of Canada